The yellow penduline tit (Anthoscopus parvulus) is a species of bird in the family Remizidae.
This small yellow passerine bird is found in semi-arid savanna regions of West Africa.

Taxonomy
The yellow penduline tit was formally described in 1864 by the German explorer and ornithologist Theodor von Heuglin under the binomial name Aegithalus parvulus. This species is now placed in the genus Anthoscopus that was introduced in 1851 by the German ornithologist Jean Cabanis. The genus name combines the Ancient Greek anthos meaning "blossom" or "flower" with skopos meaning "searcher". The specific epithet parvulus is Latin for "very small" (a diminutive of parvus meaning "small"). The yellow penduline tit is considered to be monotypic: no subspecies are recognised.

Description
It is olive-yellow above with bright yellow underparts and a dull greyish stripe through the eye. The upper wing is brown with  feathers edged with yellow. The primaries are edged with buff-white which generates a narrow whitish wing panel. The tail is brown. The bird has a conical pointed bill and strong legs. The sexes are alike.

References

yellow penduline tit
Birds of Central Africa
Birds of West Africa
yellow penduline tit
Taxa named by Theodor von Heuglin
Taxonomy articles created by Polbot